Timora sinuata is a species of moth of the family Noctuidae. It is found in India.

Heliothinae